FIBA Oceania Championship was the Oceania basketball championships that took place every two years between national teams of the continent. Through the 2015 edition, the Oceania Championship was also a qualifying tournament for the Basketball World Cups and Olympic Games.

When only Australia and New Zealand competed, the tournament was usually a best-of-three playoff; if other teams competed, a round-robin and a knockout stage was employed. In 2009, the Oceania Basketball Federation changed this format to a two-game, home-and-away playoff between the two countries, with aggregate score as the tiebreaker should the teams split the series.

Beginning in 2017, all FIBA continental championships for men were held on a four-year cycle, and the continental championships would no longer be part of the qualifying process for either the World Cup or Olympics. The 2015 Oceanian Championships were the last to be held as from 2017, the tournament merged with the former FIBA Asia Championship to give way to a competition initially billed as the FIBA Asia-Pacific Championship but now known as the FIBA Asia Cup.

Summaries

Medal table

Participating nations

See also

 FIBA Oceania
 Basketball at the Olympic Games
 Basketball at the Commonwealth Games
 Basketball at the Pacific Games
 FIBA Basketball World Cup
 FIBA Oceania Women's Championship
 Al Ramsay Shield

References

External links

Aussie Hoops

 
Oceanian championships
Basketball competitions in Oceania between national teams
Recurring sporting events established in 1971
Recurring sporting events disestablished in 2015